Ağaoğlu is a Turkish surname. People with the surname include:

 Adalet Ağaoğlu (1929–2020), Turkish novelist
 Ahmet Ağaoğlu (1869–1939), Azerbaijani and Turkish publicist and journalist
 Ali Ağaoğlu (born 1954), Turkish businessman
 Burak Ağaoğlu (born 1999), Turkish football player
 Onur Ağaoğlu (born 1990), Turkish architect and author
 Samet Ağaoğlu (1909–1982), Turkish politician
 Süreyya Ağaoğlu (1903–1989), Turkish writer
 Yeşim Ağaoğlu (born 1966), Turkish artist 

Turkish-language surnames